Kristian Hansen is a Norwegian handball player.

He made his debut on the Norwegian national team in 1995, and played 57 matches for the national team between 1995 and 2001. He competed at the 1997 World Men's Handball Championship, and again at the 2001 World Men's Handball Championship.

References

Year of birth missing (living people)
Living people
Norwegian male handball players